Smithdale is an unincorporated community and coal town in Allegheny County, Pennsylvania, United States. It is located in Elizabeth Township in the southeastern corner of Allegheny County, along the south bank of the Youghiogheny River. Immediately to the southeast is Collinsburg in Westmoreland County. To the north across the river is Sutersville, also in Westmoreland County.

References

Unincorporated communities in Allegheny County, Pennsylvania
Coal towns in Pennsylvania
Unincorporated communities in Pennsylvania